The EuroLeague MVP, or EuroLeague Full Season MVP, is the award bestowed to the player that is deemed to be the "Most Valuable Player" during the full season of the EuroLeague. The EuroLeague is the top-tier level European-wide men's professional club basketball league in Europe. The award has existed and been awarded by the EuroLeague since the 2004–05 season. It was originally awarded for play that included the league's regular season, top 16 stage, and playoffs, and currently is awarded for play that includes the regular season and playoffs, as the top 16 stage was eliminated.

So far, Anthony Parker is the only player who has won the award twice. Other than Parker, all the other winners of the award have been Europeans, with Nikola Mirotić being the most recent winner of the award for 2022.

Selection criteria
The EuroLeague MVP award is the first and only full season MVP award that is voted on and given by the EuroLeague. Previous awards like the EuroLeague Regular Season and Top 16 MVP awards were only for individual phases of the season, with the original regular season MVP award being based on the PIR stat, rather than on an actual voting process. When the EuroLeague Full Season MVP award was created, those previous awards were phased out altogether, and were replaced by the EuroLeague MVP of the Month award.

The EuroLeague MVP award is based on a voting process. Currently, online fan voting represents 25% of the vote total for the MVP award, while media voting accounts for the remaining 75%. Team success is unofficially paramount during the selection process. Since established, the award has never gone to a player whose team did not reach the EuroLeague Final Four. It is nevertheless theoretically possible for that to occur in the future, as no rule stands against it. For example, players whose teams only made it to the top 16 stage of the competition (when it existed in the past), were nominated into the online fan voting every year, and some were selected to the All-EuroLeague First Team.

History
Starting with the 2004–05 season, the EuroLeague officially began giving out its Full Season MVP award for the first time. Unlike the previous EuroLeague Regular Season and Top 16 MVP awards, this award encompasses the full season of EuroLeague, up until the EuroLeague Final Four stage. Also, rather than being based on the PIR statistical formula, like the earlier EuroLeague Regular Season MVP award, the Full Season MVP award is based on a combination of online voting by fans and the media. The online fan vote comprises 25% of the vote total, while the media vote encompasses 75% of the vote total.

Winners

Key

List 

Notes:
 There was no awarding in the 2019–20, because the season was cancelled due to the coronavirus pandemic in Europe.

Multiple honors

Players

Player nationality

Teams

See also 
EuroLeague Awards
EuroLeague Final Four MVP
EuroLeague Regular Season and Top 16 MVP
50 Greatest EuroLeague Contributors (2008)
EuroLeague Basketball 2001–10 All-Decade Team

References

External links
 EuroLeague Official Web Page
 2015-16 Euroleague MVP: Nando De Colo, CSKA Moscow
 InterBasket EuroLeague Basketball Forum
 TalkBasket EuroLeague Basketball Forum
 

Mvp
Basketball most valuable player awards